Serhiy Yuriyovych Nazarenko (born 16 February 1980) is a Ukrainian amateur footballer who plays for AM-Estate Dnipro.

He is known for having played as a midfielder for now-defunct Ukrainian football club Dnipro, its farm clubs Dnipro-2 and Dnipro-3, as well as Crimea-based Tavriya.

Nazarenko played with the Ukraine national football team between 2003 and 2012 and was called up for the 2006 World Cup and UEFA Euro 2012.

Club career
Nazarenko began his career in his hometown of Kirovohrad at Zirka Kirovohrad. He made his move to Dnipro in 1997 and although he debuted for the main team on 3 October 1999, he did not make his first-team appearance until the 2002–03 season.

In the 2006–07 season, he was voted the best player in the Ukrainian Premier League, according to a poll conducted by the "Sport-Express" newspaper.

On 29 July, he claimed the club record for most goals scored in a season with 32 goals after scoring twice against FC Metalurh Donetsk, overtaking Oleh Venglinsky with 31.

He signed a 3-year contract with Tavriya Simferopol after his contract with Dnipro expired. In the summer of 2014, Serhiy signed for club Chornomorets Odesa. On 28 January 2015, it was reported that Serhiy Nazarenko has had his contract mutually terminated by Chornomorets Odesa.

International career
Serhiy Nazarenko debuted for the Ukraine national football team on 11 October 2003 in a match against Macedonia which ended in a 0–0 draw. On 11 February 2009 Serhiy Nazarenko scored a goal against Serbia in a friendly match. On 10 June 2009 his double was essential to gain an important win over the team from Kazakhstan after trailing behind after the first 30 minutes into the game. At that, his total goals scored was 10 which put him right behind Rebrov and Shevchenko in the list of top scorers on the Ukraine national football team.

International goals

Honours

Team

"Dnipro" 

 Bronze medalist of the Premier League of the Championship of Ukraine (1): 2003–2004
 Finalist of the Cup of Ukraine (1): 2003–2004
 Semifinalist of the Cup of Ukraine (5): 2000–2001, 2001–2002, 2002–2003, 2004–2005, 2010–2011

"Dnipro-2" 
Gold medalist of the second league of the Championship of Ukraine (1): 1999–2000

Individual 

 The best player of the championship of Ukraine (according to the newspaper "Team"): 2006, 2007
 For high sports results at the 2006 World Cup in Germany, he was awarded the Order for Courage III degree
 On April 4, 2015, in the 86th minute of the match against Metalurh Donetsk, he scored the 100th goal of his career and then joined Huseynov's club

Achievements 
On June 10, 2009, scoring two goals for Kazakhstan, Nazarenko scored 10 goals for the national team and became the third top scorer in the history of the national team, after Shevchenko and Rebrov.

He was the best scorer of "Dnipro" in European Cups (8 goals).

See also
 2001 FIFA World Youth Championship squads#Ukraine

References

External links

Official team website

1980 births
Living people
Sportspeople from Kropyvnytskyi
Ukrainian footballers
Ukraine international footballers
2006 FIFA World Cup players
UEFA Euro 2012 players
FC Dnipro players
SC Tavriya Simferopol players
FC Chornomorets Odesa players
Ukrainian Premier League players
FC Metalist Kharkiv players
Association football midfielders
Ukrainian football managers